Oswaldo Guevara Mujica Airport , is an airport serving Acarigua, a city in the Portuguesa state of Venezuela.

The Acarigua VOR-DME (Ident: AGV) and non-directional beacon (Ident: AGV) are located on the field.

Airlines and destinations

See also
Transport in Venezuela
List of airports in Venezuela

References

External links
OurAirports - Acarigua
OpenStreetMap - Acarigua
SkyVector - Acarigua

Airports in Venezuela
Buildings and structures in Portuguesa (state)
Buildings and structures in Acarigua